Paulina is a female given name. It is a female version of Paulinus, a variant of Paulus meaning the little. 

Paula and Pauline are variants on this name.

Notable people
 Paulina, the name of several Roman women related to Emperor Hadrian
 Lollia Paulina (15-49), third wife of Emperor Caligula
 Caecilia Paulina (died 236), wife of Emperor Maximinus Thrax, posthumously deified as diva Paulina
 Aurelia Paulina, daughter of the Emperor Carus
 Aurelia Paulina, a Roman noblewoman from Anatolia
 Saint Paulina (1865–1942), of the Agonizing Heart of Jesus
 Paulina Peled, nee Peisachov (born 1950), Israeli tennis player
 Paulina Porizkova (born 1965), Swedish model and actress
 Paulina Rubio (born 1971), Mexican singer and actress
 Paulina Vega (born 1993), Colombian beauty pageant titleholder who won Miss Universe 2014

Fictional characters
 Paulina Sanchez in the Nickelodeon cartoon Danny Phantom
 Paulina Hlinka in the Bert Diaries
 Paulina, a noblewoman in The Winter's Tale, by Shakespeare.
 Paulina, one of the Thea Sisters from Peru in Thea Stilton

See also
Paulina (disambiguation)
Paulino

Paulina
Polish feminine given names
Czech feminine given names
English feminine given names
Filipino feminine given names
Italian feminine given names
Lithuanian feminine given names
Spanish feminine given names

cs:Pavlína
de:Pauline
hu:Paulina
pl:Paulina
ru:Павлина
sr:Паулина (име)